A conference tournament in college basketball is a tournament held at the end of the regular season to determine a conference tournament champion.  It is usually held in four rounds, but can vary, depending on the conference.  All Division I Conferences hold a conference tournament except the Ivy League, which determines a champion based solely on regular season standings.  Winners of each tournament and the Ivy League champion get automatic bids to the NCAA Tournament.